Nicolás Sebastián Martínez Remírez (born 1 August 1998) is a Uruguayan professional footballer who plays as a goalkeeper.

Career
Martínez's career started in Villa Española's ranks. He first appeared on a first-team teamsheet in November 2015 as the goalkeeper was an unused substitute for a match with Miramar Misiones in the Uruguayan Segunda División, as he was two years following against Villa Teresa. He was on the bench sixteen times during the 2018 season, before eventually making his senior debut on 19 August as Villa Española drew 4–4 with Tacuarembó at the Estadio Goyenola on their way to placing tenth.

Career statistics
.

References

External links

1998 births
Living people
Footballers from Montevideo
Uruguayan footballers
Association football goalkeepers
Uruguayan Segunda División players
Villa Española players